Cornops is a genus of spur-throat toothpick grasshoppers in the family Acrididae. There are about six described species in Cornops.

Species
These six species belong to the genus Cornops:
 Cornops aquaticum (Bruner, 1906)  (Mexico, Central America, and South America)
 Cornops brevipenne Roberts & Carbonell, 1979  (Bolivia, Brazil, Ecuador, and Peru)
 Cornops dorsatum (Bruner, 1911)  (Brazil)
 Cornops frenatum (Marschall, 1836)  (Central and South America)
 Cornops longipenne (De Geer, 1773)  (northern South America)
 Cornops paraguayense (Bruner, 1906)  (Central and South America)

References

External links

 

Acrididae